Utcubamba (hispanicized spelling), in Quechua Utkhupampa (utkhu cotton, pampa a large plain, "cotton plain"), is one of seven provinces of the Amazonas Region, Peru. It was created by Law#-23843 on May 30, 1984. Its capital is Bagua Grande and its principal attraction is the Tourist Corridor of Utcubamba where the valley becomes notably closer forming "the canyon of Utcubamba". These conditions modify the climate in a substantial way and create a radical ecological shift. The  area is fresh and fragrant and the orchids that are bountiful are unique in the world. Notably picturesque cascades are observed in the rocky vertical walls that the river has created. There are hot springs a few meters from El Ingenio bridge.

The selection of this corridor lies in the beauty of the scenery and in the tourist activities that can be generated in it, like canoeing, minor watercraft navigation, fishing and recreation sports.

Political division

Utcubamba is divided into seven districts, which are:

Places of interest 
 Cordillera de Colán Reserved Zone
 Hanan Wak'a
 Kuntur Puna
 Q'arachupa
 Willka

References

External links
Utcubamba regional official website 

Provinces of the Amazonas Region